Lloyd George Richards (born 11 February 1958) is a Jamaican former professional footballer who played as a midfielder in the Football League for Notts County and York City, and in non-League football for Ilkeston Town.

References

1958 births
Living people
Sportspeople from Kingston, Jamaica
Jamaican footballers
Association football midfielders
Notts County F.C. players
York City F.C. players
Ilkeston Town F.C. (1945) players
English Football League players